Harana was an all-male vocal group from the Philippines. It is under ABS-CBN and Star Music.

History

Pre-debut
Star Music' head, Roxy Liquigan shared that initially it was Joseph and Bryan who inspired the formation of the boyband.

Michael came into the picture when Star Music was looking for an artist to sing Joven Tan's “Pare Mahal Mo Raw Ako,” an entry at the 2014 Himig Handog P-Pop Love Songs. Marlo then completed the group when he finished shooting for hit daytime show, Be Careful with My Heart.

2015–2018 
ASAP launched their newest boy group called “Harana” with members, Joseph Marco, Bryan Santos, Michael Pangilinan and Marlo Mortel with their carrier single, “Number One”. On ASAP Chillout, the boys serenaded their fans with their version of the 60's hit, “Baby I need Your Loving”.

After Harana served as opening act in KZ Tandingan’s concert at the Music Museum last 17 April 2015, more gig offers poured in for the group. The group also showed that they’re the all-in-one package, showing off their charm, good looks and notable singing voices as they performed their debut single “Number One” at the OPM Fresh press conference last April 28.

They performed recently at the “Most Wanted” concert of Daniel Padilla at the SM Mall Of Asia Arena last June 13, 2015.

Harana disbanded in 2018. After Michael Pangilinan guested in GMA Network, Joseph Marco focused on being an actor.

Members
The group is composed of: 
Joseph "Joey" Marco (Kapamilya heartthrob) 
Marlo Mortel (singer-actor) 
Michael "Khel" Pangilinan (singer and actor) 
Bryan Santos (M.O.R. disc jockey and actor)

Discography

Music videos

Singles

Compilation albums

Studio albums

Accolades

References

External links
 Star Music Official Website

Star Magic
Star Music artists
Filipino boy bands
Musical groups established in 2015
Vocal quartets
2015 establishments in the Philippines